John Dickie may refer to:

 John Dickie (evangelist) (1823–1891), Scottish evangelist and writer
 John Dickie (historian) (born 1963), British author, historian and academic
 John Dickie (theologian) (1875–1942), New Zealand Presbyterian theologian and professor
 John Purcell Dickie (1874–1963), British politician
 John Barnhill Dickie (1829–1886), farmer, teacher and political figure in Nova Scotia, Canada
 John Dickie (footballer) (1900–1976), Scottish footballer, played for Barrow

See also
 John Dickey (disambiguation)